Kessy is a surname. Notable people with the surname include:

 Doreen Kessy, COO at Ubongo Learning Inc.
 Jennifer Kessy (born 1977), American beach volleyball player
 Kale Kessy, Canadian ice hockey player
 Paul Kessy (1915–1971), American basketball player
 Hassan Kessy (born 1994), Tanzanian footballer